The 2015 Men's NORCECA Volleyball Championship was the 24th edition of the tournament, played from 5 to 10 October 2015 in Córdoba, Mexico. The top 4 teams who had not yet qualified from the 2016 Summer Olympics automatically qualified to the NORCECA Olympic Qualifier.

Competing nations
The following national teams have qualified:

Squads

Pool standing procedure
 Number of matches won
 Match points
 Points ratio
 Sets ratio
 Result of the last match between the tied teams

Match won 3–0: 5 match points for the winner, 0 match points for the loser
Match won 3–1: 4 match points for the winner, 1 match point for the loser
Match won 3–2: 3 match points for the winner, 2 match points for the loser

Preliminary round

Pool A

Pool B

Final round

Quarterfinals

Fifth place match

Semifinals

Sixth place match

Bronze medal match

Final

Final standing

All-Star team

Most Valuable Player

Best Outside Hitters

Best Middle Blockers

Best Setter

Best Opposite

Best Scorer

Best Server

Best Libero

Best Digger

Best Receiver

References

External links

Men's NORCECA Volleyball Championship
NORCECA
2015 in Mexican sports
International volleyball competitions hosted by Mexico
Sport in Veracruz